Vijay is an Indian actor and singer who works in Tamil cinema.

Honours
 Kalaimaamani (1998)
 Honorary Doctorate – Dr. M.G.R. Educational and Research Institute (2007)
 Runner-up: Most Trusted South Indian Personality (2019)
 Best International Actor (2018) awarded in UK

National Film Awards UK 

|-
|2018
|Mersal
|Best Actor
|

Tamil Nadu State Film Awards

|-
|1997
|Kadhalukku Mariyadhai
|Best Actor
| 
|-
|2000
|Thulladha Manamum Thullum
|MGR Award 
|
|-
|2005
|Thirupaachi
|Best Actor (Special Prize)
|

Star India Awards

|-
|2006
| colspan=2 |Superstar of Tomorrow
|
|-
|rowspan=2 |2007
|Pokkiri / Azhagiya Tamil Magan
|Entertainer of the Year
|
|-
|Pokkiri
|Favourite Hero
|
|-
|2008
|Kuruvi
|Favourite Hero
|
|-
|2009
|Vettaikaaran
|Favourite Hero
|
|-
|2010
|Sura
|Favourite Hero
|
|-
|2011
|Velayudham
|Favourite Hero
|
|-
|rowspan=4 |2012
|Nanban / Thuppakki
|Entertainer of the Year
|
|-
|rowspan=3 | Thuppakki
|Favourite Hero
|
|-
|Favourite Song
|
|-
|Best Actor
|
|-
|2013
|Thalaivaa
|Favourite Hero
|
|-
|rowspan=4 |2014
|Jilla / Kaththi
|Entertainer of the Year
|
|-
|rowspan=3 | Kaththi
|Favourite Hero
|
|-
|Favourite Song
|
|-
|Best Actor
|
|-
|rowspan=2 | 2018
|rowspan=2 | Mersal
|Favourite Hero
|
|-
|Best Actor
|
|-

South Indian International Movie Awards

|-
|rowspan=2 |2012
|rowspan=2 | Thuppakki
|Best Actor
|
|-
|Best Male Playback Singer (for Google Google)
|
|-
|2014
|Kaththi
|Best Actor
|
|-
|rowspan=2 |2016
|rowspan=2 | Theri
|Best Entertainer
|
|-
|Best Actor
|
|-
|2017
|Mersal
|Best Actor
|
|-
|2019
|Bigil
|Best Actor
|
|-
|2021
|Master
|Best Actor
|

Edison Awards

|-
|rowspan=2 |2011
|rowspan=2 |Velayudham
|Best Actor
|
|-
|Super Star Rajini Award
|
|-
|2012
|Thuppakki
|Best Actor
|
|-
|2014
|Kaththi
|Best Actor
|
|-
|2015
|Puli
|Mass Hero
|
|-
|2016
|Theri
|Mass Hero
|
|-
|2017
|Mersal
|Mass Hero
|

Behindwoods Gold Medals

|-
|rowspan=2 |2014
|rowspan=2 | Kaththi
|Best Actor in a Lead Role — Male
|
|-
|People's Choice Actor — Male
|
|-
|rowspan=2 |2016
|colspan=2 | The Samrat of South Indian Box Office
|
|-
|Theri
|People's Choice Actor — Male
|

Ananda Vikatan Cinema Awards

|-
|2012
|Nanban / Thuppakki
|Best Actor
|
|-
|2017
|Mersal
|Best Actor
|
|-

Asianet Film Awards

|-
|2010
|Special Award
|Most Popular Tamil Actor
|
|-

Techofes Awards

|-
|2012
|Thuppakki
|Best Actor
|
|-
|-
|2013
|Thalaivaa 
|Favourite Actor
|
|-
|rowspan=2 |2017
|rowspan=2 |Mersal
|Favourite Actor
|
|-
|Best Entertainer
|
|-

Cosmopolitan Awards

|-
|2012
|Nanban / Thuppakki
|Cosmopolitan People Choice Award for Best Actor
|
|-

Kumudam Awards

|-
|2014
|Special Award
|People Choice Superstar Award
|
|-

Indiatoday Awards

|-
|2018
|Special Award
|Tamil Nadu Best Actor 
|
|-

Dinakaran Awards

|-
|2004
|Ghilli
|Best Actor
|
|-

Madras Club Awards

|-
|2004
|Ghilli
|Best Actor
|
|-

Mathrubhumi Film Awards

|-
|2007
|Pokkiri
|Best Tamil Actor
|
|-

FilmToday Awards

|-
|2004
|Ghilli
|Best Actor
|
|-

Roja Duke's Film Awards

|-
|1998
|Kadhalukku Mariyadhai
|Best Actor
|
|-

Cinema Express Awards

|-
|1992
|Naalaiya Theerpu
|New Face
|

Isaiaruvi TV Awards

|-
|2007
|Pokkiri
|Best Hero
|
|-
|2009
|Vettaikaran
|Favourite Actor 
|
|-

Ghana Music Awards

|-
|2013
|Vaanganna Vannakanganna
|Popular song of the year
|
|-

Variety Film Awards

|-
|2011
|Kaavalan / Velayudham
|Hero of the Year
|

Zee Cine Awards

|-
|2020
|Bigil
|Favourite Hero
|
|-

Filmfare Awards South

|-
|2007
|Pokkiri
|Best Actor
|
|-
|2012
|Thuppakki
|Best Actor
|
|-
|rowspan=2 |2014
|rowspan=2 | Kaththi
|Best Actor
|
|-
|Best Playback Singer - Male (for Selfie Pulla)
|
|-
|2016
|Theri
|Best Actor
|
|-
|2017
|Mersal
|Best Actor
|
|-
|2018
|Sarkar
|Best Actor
|
|-

References

Vijay
Awards